Jalen Robinson (born May 8, 1994) is an American soccer player who plays as defender for Detroit City in the USL Championship.

Youth and amateur soccer

Robinson grew up in the Washington metropolitan area, and played for Bethesda SC in Maryland, before signing on with D.C. United's academy. After two years of playing for the academy, Robinson opted to forgo a professional contract and signed a scholarship to play college soccer at Wake Forest University. Robinson was a two-year starter for the Wake Forest Demon Deacons men's soccer program, where he earned the All-ACC Second Team in 2013.

Professional career 

Robinson signed a homegrown contract with MLS club D.C. United on January 6, 2014. In March 2014, he was loaned to USL Pro affiliate club Richmond Kickers.  His professional debut and only appearance for the Kickers came on April 26 in a 5–1 victory over the Dayton Dutch Lions. After six weeks in Richmond and unable to find much playing time, D.C. United recalled Robinson and loaned him to Arizona United. With Arizona, Robinson made 14 appearances for the club.

Ahead of the 2015 season, Robinson was loaned out once again to Richmond. On March 28, 2015, in the first game of the 2015 USL season, Robinson scored his first professional goal in a 2–2 draw against Wilmington Hammerheads FC.

Robinson made his D.C. United debut on June 19, 2016, coming on against the Houston Dynamo as a late game substitute.  Robinson played in the following game against the New England Revolution, lifting a depleted D.C. United defensive back line to 2–0 shutout in his first MLS start.  Robinson was credited with three blocked shots, five recoveries, seven clearances, four interceptions and two tackles while completing 85.7% of his passes.  Fans and teammates alike commented that his performance made him a Man of the Match contender.

Robinson's contract with D.C. United ended after the 2019 season.

On May 21, 2021, Robinson signed with USL Championship club Pittsburgh Riverhounds SC.

Robinson joined USL Championship side Loudoun United FC on May 25, 2022.

Robinson made the move to USL Championship side Detroit City on February 2, 2023, joining on a one-year deal.

References

External links

Wake Forest Demon Deacons bio

1994 births
Living people
21st-century African-American sportspeople
African-American soccer players
American soccer players
Association football defenders
D.C. United players
Detroit City FC players
Homegrown Players (MLS)
Loudoun United FC players
Major League Soccer players
People from Catonsville, Maryland
Pittsburgh Riverhounds SC players
Phoenix Rising FC players
Richmond Kickers players
Soccer players from Maryland
Sportspeople from Baltimore County, Maryland
United States men's youth international soccer players
USL Championship players
Wake Forest Demon Deacons men's soccer players